Sir John de Wingfield (died c. 1361) of Wingfield Castle in Suffolk was chief administrator to Edward the Black Prince (1330-1376). He and both his brothers fought at Crécy in 1346. He fought in the Normandy campaign from 1347-48. He was appointed 'governor of the prince's business' (in effect business-manager) to Edward the Black Prince round about 1351. In 1356 Wingfield fought at Poitiers capturing the head of the French King John II's bodyguard, Sire D'Aubigny. Edward III of England purchased this captive from Wingfield for £833. Wingfield died in about 1361, possibly of the second outbreak of the Black Death.

His will provided for the founding of Wingfield College in 1362. The college was endowed by the Black Prince. Sir John Wingfield's only child, his daughter and heiress Catherine Wingfield, married Michael de la Pole, later 1st Earl of Suffolk and lived at Wingfield Castle in Suffolk.

Sources
Register of Edward, the Black Prince, preserved in the Public Record Office, prepared under the superintendence of the Deputy Keeper of the Records. Vols 1 to 4
Wrottesley, Staffs, II, 33,38.
P. H. W. Booth, The Financial Administration of the Lordship and County of Chester, 1272-1377, Chetham Society, third series, 38 (1981), pp. 73-9, 133, 136.

External links
Wingfield Family Society | Wingfield Family Society
St. Andrews Church Wingfield :: Welcome

Wingfield, John
Wingfield family

1360s deaths
Year of birth unknown

Year of death uncertain